Middle Ohio is a community of the Municipality of the District of Shelburne in the Canadian province of Nova Scotia.

References

Middle Ohio on Destination Nova Scotia

Communities in Shelburne County, Nova Scotia
General Service Areas in Nova Scotia